The Queen Adelaide was a pub at 412 Uxbridge Road, Shepherd's Bush, London W12. It is a Greene King property.

It is a Grade II listed building, built in about 1900.

References

External links
 
 

Grade II listed pubs in London
Pubs in the London Borough of Hammersmith and Fulham